Female Age-Mates is a 1959 Soviet drama film directed by Vasili Ordynsky.

Plot 
The life paths of three school friends diverged: Tanya began to study medicine, Kira decided to become an actress, and Svetlana as a result of unsuccessful exams began working at the factory. All of them will experience a feeling of love, but only one of them will be happy.

Cast 
 Lyudmila Krylova as Svetlana
 Lidiya Fedoseyeva-Shukshina as Tanya (as Lidiya Fedoseeva)
 Margarita Koselyeva as Kira (as Margarita Koshelyova)
 Vladimir Kostin as Vassya
 Vsevolod Safonov as Arkadi
 Kirill Stolyarov as Yurotschka
 Vladimir Koretsky as Gleb
 Vladimir Vysotskiy

References

External links 
 

1959 films
1950s Russian-language films
Soviet drama films
1959 drama films